Christy Lorraine Knowings (born February 25, 1980) is an American actress and comedienne who served three seasons on the Nickelodeon sketch-comedy series All That (where she replaced Alisa Reyes in 1997 and was replaced by Giovonnie Samuels in 2002).

All That 
After Tricia Dickson, Katrina Johnson and Alisa Reyes left All That, the producers brought in Danny Tamberelli, Leon Frierson, and Christy Knowings. Knowings had previously been a performer on a Rosie O'Donnell sketch-comedy special produced by Nickelodeon entitled, And Now This. She and her twin brother, actor Chris Knowings, were in the Rosie O'Donnell special greenroom, unaware that two casting directors from All That were in the room. Chris told Christy to do her impressions and accents. The casting directors asked Christy to audition, which she did, and she got the job.

Knowings remained on the show until the end of Season 6 in 2000. Her characters included Penny Lane (inheriting the role from Alisa Reyes, who herself had inherited the role from Angelique Bates), the dental assistant for Dr. Bynes, Lieutenant Fondue, Jessica from Whateverrr!!!, Yoko from CJ and the Cloudy Knights, Brenda Stone from Channel 6 1/2 News, and Winter Wonders from What Do You Do? What Do You Do? was a parody of the Nickelodeon game show Figure It Out, and Winter Wonders was a parody of Summer Sanders. Knowings herself was a panelist a few times on Figure It Out.

Life after All That
Knowings  made a small cameo in the green room for the show's 10th Anniversary Special.

She made three episode appearances on Sesame Street, alongside her real-life twin brother Chris Knowings.

References

External links 
 

1980 births
20th-century American actresses
21st-century American actresses
Actresses from New York City
Living people
Entertainers from the Bronx
American twins
African-American female comedians
American women comedians
American television actresses
African-American actresses
American child actresses
Comedians from New York City
20th-century American comedians
21st-century American comedians
People from the Bronx
20th-century African-American women
20th-century African-American people
21st-century African-American women
21st-century African-American people